Kristin P. Kuster (born 1973) is an American composer of symphonic, vocal and chamber music.

Biography 

Kuster was born Kristin Peterson in Raleigh, North Carolina and grew up in Boulder, Colorado. She received her Doctor of Musical Arts degree from the University of Michigan, where she studied with William Bolcom, Michael Daugherty, Evan Chambers, and William Albright. She was awarded the Charles Ives Fellowship from the American Academy of Arts and Letters and the Underwood Emerging Composer Commission from American Composers Orchestra. Kuster is an Associate Professor of Composition at the University of Michigan School of Music, Theatre & Dance. She lives in Ann Arbor, Michigan. She was married to Andrew Kuster from 1997 to 2011.

Style 

Kuster "writes commandingly for the orchestra," and her music "has an invitingly tart edge" (The New York Times). Kuster's colorfully enthralling compositions take inspiration from architectural space, the weather, and mythology. Her orchestral music "unquestionably demonstrates her expertise in crafting unique timbres" (Steve Smith, Night after Night).

Works 
Orchestra and orchestra with voices
 Iron Diamond (2005)
 Myrrha (2006)
 Beneath This Stone (2007)
 Rain On It (2012)
 Devil's Thumb (2013)

Opera and musical theatre
 The Trickster & The Troll (2008)
 A Thousand Acres (2022)

Wind ensemble
 Interior (2006)
 Lost Gulch Lookout (2008)
 Two Jades (2011)

Chamber ensemble
 Ando: Light Against Ahade (2003)
 Jellyfish (2004)
 Breath Beneath (2004)
 Ribbon Earth (2008)
 Perpetual Noon (2008)
 Midnight Mirror (2009)
 Perpetual Afternoon (2009)
 Little Trees (2009)
 Here, Leaving (2010)
 Sweet Poison (2011)
 Rain Chain (2012)
 Parting Wish (2012)
 Ribbon Windows, Curtain Walls (2013)
 Readings From the Middle Seat (2013)
 Red Pine (2014)

Vocal ensemble
 Myrrha (2006)
 Bleed (2007)
 Redness (2008)
 Zephyrus (2009)
 Home (2010)
 Given a Body (2012, 2013)
 Volta (2013)
 Moonrise (2013)
 White Hurricane: 1915 (2014)

Vocal solo
 Silken Branches (2007)
 Soon (2007)
 Sorrow (2007)
 Dream Black Night (2007)
 Long Ago (2008)
 King (2013)

References 

 Kuster, Kristin P., biography at Naxos Records
 Composer Kristin Kuster Wins 2004 Underwood Commission American Composers Orchestra website

External links 
 
 University of Michigan
 , Xiang Gao (violin), University of Michigan Symphony Band, Michael Haithcock conducting, Hill Auditorium, May 2011

1973 births
Living people
Musicians from Raleigh, North Carolina
Musicians from Boulder, Colorado
Musicians from Ann Arbor, Michigan
20th-century classical composers
21st-century classical composers
American women classical composers
American classical composers
University of Michigan School of Music, Theatre & Dance alumni
21st-century American composers
20th-century American women musicians
20th-century American composers
21st-century American women musicians
Classical musicians from Michigan
20th-century women composers
21st-century women composers